Heaven is Round the Corner is a 1944 British musical film, directed by Maclean Rogers. It was made by British National Films, starring Will Fyffe, Leni Lynn, Leslie Perrins, and Austin Trevor. The script was written by Austin Melford.

Plot
A country girl goes to Paris to sing professionally, where she falls in love with a member of the British Embassy. They are parted by the outbreak of the Second World War, but subsequently reunited again.

Music 
The film's music was by Kennedy Russell, with lyrics by Desmond O'Connor. They wrote the title song, which was featured in the film by contralto singer Leni Lynn. "Heaven is Round the Corner" was listed among Britain's bestselling sheet music titles in June 1944.

Cast
 Will Fyffe as Dougal
 Leni Lynn as Joan Sedley
 Austin Trevor as John Cardew
 Magda Kun as Musette
 Peter Glenville as Donald McKay
 Barbara Waring as Dorothy Trevor
 Leslie Perrins as Robert Sedley
 Barbara Couper as Mrs. Trevor
 Toni Edgar-Bruce as Mrs. Harcourt
 Hugh Dempster as Captain Crowe
 Paul Bonifas as Rostond
 Jan Van Loewen as Titoni
 Rosamund Greenwood as Maid
 Elsa Tee as Nora Thompson
 Marcel de Haes as Louis

References

1944 films
British musical drama films
1940s musical drama films
British black-and-white films
1944 drama films
Films shot at British National Studios
1940s English-language films
1940s British films